Liudmila Titova was a Jewish-Ukrainian poet from Kiev, wife of the poet Ivan Yelagin (Іван Єлагін) also from Kiev, whom she had first met as a schoolgirl. Her famous poem "Babi Yar" written in 1941 – discovered only in the 1990s – was the first-ever literary work devoted to the 1941 massacre of Ukrainian Jews during the Holocaust. She was an eyewitness of these events.

References

Jewish Ukrainian poets
Ukrainian women poets
20th-century Ukrainian women